John Bellenden Ker, originally John Gawler, was an English botanist born about 1764 in Ramridge, Andover, Hampshire and died in June 1842 in the same town. On 5 November 1804 he changed his name to Ker Bellenden, but continued to sign his name as Bellenden Ker until his death. He was an unsuccessful claimant to the Roxburghe dukedom. His son was the legal reformer Charles Henry Bellenden Ker.

He is noted for having written Recensio Plantarum (1801), Select Orchideae (c. 1816) and Iridearum Genera (1827). He contributed to Curtis's Botanical Magazine under John Sims, using the initial G. He edited Edward's Botanical Register from 1815 to 1824 and was famous as a wit and botanist as well as being the author of Archaeology of Popular Phrases and Nursery Rhymes (1837). The 2nd volume of this work was published in 1840. Robert Brown (1773–1858) named the genus Bellendena of the Proteaceae in his honour in 1810. The state of Queensland in Australia has named its second highest peak Mount Bellenden Ker. The Bellenden Ker Range in the same area was also named after him.

His work on English nursery rhymes argued in four volumes that they were actually written in "Low Saxon", a hypothetical early form of Dutch. He then "translated" them back into English, revealing particularly a strong tendency to anti-clericalism.

Notes

Sources
Ray Desmond (1994). Dictionary of British and Irish Botanists and Horticulturists including Plant Collectors, Flower Painters and Garden Designers. Taylor & Francis and The Natural History Museum (London).

1764 births
1842 deaths
British botanists